Fath Ali shah inscription (Persian: Katibeh Fathalisha Ghajar)  is located in Cheshmeh-Ali in Rey, Iran. This work is one of several inscriptions made in the Fath Ali Shah era, located on Cheshmeh-Ali hill. Fath Ali shah inscription is spot in north of Rey near Cheshmeh-Ali park and beneath the Rey Castle.

See Also 

 Rashkan Castle
 Rey Castle

References

Qajar Iran
Cheshmeh-Ali complex